Carola Höhn (30 January 1910 – 8 November 2005) was a German stage and movie actress.

Selected filmography

Film

 The Weekend Bride (1928)
  Don Juan in a Girls' School (1928)
 From a Bachelor's Diary (1929)
  Youthful Indiscretion (1929)
  The Living Corpse (1929)
 Charley's Aunt (1934)
 Holiday From Myself (1934)
 Just Once a Great Lady (1934)
 April, April! (1935)
 Every Day Isn't Sunday (1935)
 The Old and the Young King (1935)
 The Royal Waltz (1935)
 The Beggar Student (1936)
 To New Shores (1937)
 Comrades at Sea (1938)
 Hurrah! I'm a Father (1939)
 The Green Emperor (1939)
 We Danced Around the World (1939)
 Beatrice Cenci (1941)
 Why Are You Lying, Elisabeth? (1944)
 The Rabanser Case (1950)
 Toxi (1952)
 The Exchange (1952)
 Weekend in Paradise (1952)
 Such a Charade (1953)
 The Country Schoolmaster (1954)
 Sun Over the Adriatic (1954)
 I'll See You at Lake Constance (1956)
 Victor and Victoria (1957)
 I Must Go to the City (1962)

Television
 Derrick – Season 4, Episode 2: "Hals in der Schlinge" (1977)
 Derrick – Season 5, Episode 9: "Lissas Vater" (1978)
 Derrick – Season 6, Episode 10: "Das dritte Opfer" (1979)
 Derrick – Season 7, Episode 11: "Pricker" (1980)

Honours
 1989 Bavarian Film Awards
 1990 Deutscher Filmpreis
 1999 Federal Cross of Merit on Ribbon

References
 Höhn, Carola (2005). Fange nie an aufzuhören.... Koblenz

External links

 Carola Höhn @ filmportal.de
 
 
 

1910 births
2005 deaths
People from Bremerhaven
People from the Province of Hanover
German film actresses
German stage actresses
20th-century German actresses
Recipients of the Cross of the Order of Merit of the Federal Republic of Germany